Justin Hall (born December 16, 1974, in Chicago, Illinois) is an American journalist and entrepreneur, best known as a pioneer blogger.

Biography

Born in Chicago, Hall graduated Francis W. Parker High School in 1993.  In 1994, while a student at Swarthmore College, Justin started his web-based diary Justin's Links from the Underground, which offered one of the earliest guided tours of the web. Over time, the site came to focus on Hall's life in intimate detail. In December 2004, New York Times Magazine referred to him as "the founding father of personal blogging."

In 1994, during a break from college Hall joined HotWired, the first commercial web magazine started within Wired magazine.  There, he began a long-term working partnership with critic, writer and teacher Howard Rheingold. Later Hall would become a freelance journalist covering video games, mobile technology and internet culture.  He published analysis from game conferences such as E3 as well as the Tokyo Game Show.  He chronicled the first Indie Game Jam in 2002.  From late 2001 and 2003, Hall was based in Japan, mostly Tokyo and Akita, authoring a guidebook Just In Tokyo.

In 2007, Hall graduated from the MFA program in the USC Interactive Media Division.  His thesis project was an attempt to make surfing the web into a multiplayer game: PMOG, the Passively Multiplayer Online Game.  Hall went on to serve as CEO of GameLayers, which raised $2 million to turn PMOG into The Nethernet, a MMO in a Firefox toolbar.  The Nethernet failed to turn a profit, and GameLayers closed down as a company.  The server and client software for the Nethernet was released as open source and Hall went on to publish A Story of GameLayers, "open-sourcing our business process".

At present, Hall lives in San Francisco, California. He served as a Producer on ngmoco:)'s Touch Pets series, and then became ngmoco:)'s Director of Culture & Communications.  After working for ngmoco:)'s parent company DeNA as a Recruiter, Hall left the company in mid-2013. In 2015 he released a self-produced short documentary Overshare: the Links.net Story exploring his "extremely personal blogging". In September 2017, Hall began work as co-founder & Chief Technology Officer for bud.com, a California benefit corporation delivering recreational cannabis, built on a domain he registered in 1994.

Selected works 
 Playing a Life Online - an audio recording March 11, 2006 (speech at South by Southwest in Austin, Texas USA)
 "The Fantasy Life of Coder Boys", April 2003, Wired
 "Where the Geeks Are", August 19, 1999, Rolling Stone
 "Today's Visions of the Science of Tomorrow", January 4, 2003, New York Times op-ed
 "Hire This Boy To Play Your Video Games", October 12, 2000, Rolling Stone
 Just In Tokyo, 2002, Garrett County Press.

Contributor 
 J. Goldstein & J. Raessens, Handbook of Computer Game Studies, MIT Press, 2005: Chapter on "Future of Games: Mobile Gaming"
 T. Fullerton & C. Swain, Game Design Workshop, CMP Books, 2004: Sidebar/chapter on "The Indie Game Jam."
 V. Burnham, Supercade: A Visual History of the Videogame Age, MIT Press, 2001: Essays on the Apple ][, Burger Time and Spy Hunter.

Films 
 Hall was featured in the documentary Home Page.
 He appeared nude as an actor in Blood.
 Hall appears in the science fiction film Radio Free Steve.
 Hall appeared in Famke Janssen's critically panned 2011 film Bringing Up Bobby.

Further reading
 Justin Hall, Passively Multiplayer Online Games. International Journal of Communication, 16 November 2006
 Yahoo Internet Life, May 2001, "Who let the Blogs out?"
 Jeffrey Rosen, Your Blog or Mine? New York Times Magazine, 19 December 2004
 Rosenberg, Scott, Say Everything: How Blogging Began, What It's Becoming, and Why It Matters, New York : Crown Publishers, 2009.

References

External links 

 
 "Dark Night" video clip of his breakdown
 July 2010 Photo of Justin Hall by Howard Rheingold

1974 births
Living people
Writers from Chicago
Swarthmore College alumni
American male bloggers
American bloggers
American male journalists
USC Interactive Media & Games Division alumni
21st-century American non-fiction writers
Francis W. Parker School (Chicago) alumni